Sallieu Bundu (born January 1, 1984, in Freetown, Sierra Leone) nicknamed Teacher, is a Sierra Leonean footballer.

Early life
Bundu, who is commonly known by his nickname Teacher, grew up in his hometown of Freetown, Sierra Leone, the second largest city in Sierra Leone. He attended the Independence Memorial High School.  At the age of 15, Bundu fled on foot with his mother and siblings to Guinea to escape the civil war in his home country; his father was murdered by rebels. After five years of living in Guinea, Bundu's brother won a US immigrant visa in the Green Card Lottery, allowing the family to settle in the United States.

Career

Professional
Bundu settled in Twinsburg, Ohio, and on April 10, 2008, signed with the Cleveland City Stars after impressing head coach Martin Rennie in a trial. He was a revelation in his first season with the team, netting 8 goals in 19 appearances, and on August 23, 2008, scored the winning goal for Cleveland in the USL Second Division championship game. Sallieu Bundu has walked on the way to sign a contract with Carolina RailHawks FC.

Carolina loaned Bundu to Charlotte Eagles of the USL Pro league for the 2011 season.

Bundu went on loan to Ravan Baku of the Azerbaijan Premier League at the start of the 2012–2013 season. Bundu made three appearances for Ravan, scoring once.

Bundu signed with USL Pro club Charleston Battery on March 20, 2012.

International
Bundu has recently been called up to the Sierra Leone national team.

References

8. http://www.D-VLottery.com

External links
 Charleston Battery bio

1984 births
Living people
Sierra Leonean footballers
Cleveland City Stars players
North Carolina FC players
Charlotte Eagles players
Charleston Battery players
VSI Tampa Bay FC players
Sportspeople from Freetown
USL First Division players
USL Second Division players
USSF Division 2 Professional League players
USL Championship players
Sierra Leonean expatriates in the United States
Temne people
Sierra Leonean emigrants to the United States
Expatriate soccer players in the United States
Ravan Baku FC players
People from Twinsburg, Ohio
Association football forwards